Novoaltaysk is a town in Altai Krai, Russia, located on the right bank of the Ob River, in the lower reaches of its right tributary the Chesnokovka,  across from Barnaul, the administrative center of the krai. Population:    51,000 (1974); 9,000 (1939).

History
It was founded in 1736 as the village of Chesnokovka. In 1934, a sawmill was built. In 1941, during the Great Patriotic War, Dniprodzerzhynsk Carriage Works was evacuated here from Dniprodzerzhynsk, on the Eastern Front in the Ukrainian Soviet Socialist Republic. In 1942, Chesnokovka was granted town status and in 1962 it was given its present name.

Administrative and municipal status
Within the framework of administrative divisions, Novoaltaysk serves as the administrative center of Pervomaysky District, even though it is not a part of it. As an administrative division, it is incorporated separately as the town of krai significance of Novoaltaysk—an administrative unit with the status equal to that of the districts. As a municipal division, the town of krai significance of Novoaltaysk is incorporated as Novoaltaysk Urban Okrug.

Transportation
Novoaltaysk is a major transportation hub and home to one of the ten largest railway station units in Russia. The town is located at the intersection of railways and highways of federal importance.

Notable people
 

Stepan Akelkin (born 1985), former Russian professional footballer

References

Notes

Sources

Cities and towns in Altai Krai
Populated places on the Ob River